Daily News or The Daily News is the name of several daily newspapers around the world, including:

Australia 
 Tweed Daily News, New South Wales
 Warwick Daily News, Queensland
 Daily News (Perth, Western Australia) (1882–1990)
 Daily News (Sydney) (1938–1940), formerly Labor Daily, then merged into The Daily Telegraph (Sydney)

Bahrain 
 Gulf Daily News

Botswana 
 Daily News Botswana

Canada 
 Ming Pao Daily News (Canada)
 Dawson Creek Daily News, British Columbia
 The Kamloops Daily News, British Columbia
 Nanaimo Daily News, British Columbia
 Nelson Daily News (1902–2010), British Columbia
 Prince Rupert Daily News (1911–2010), British Columbia
 The Daily News (Halifax), Nova Scotia
 The Daily News (1955–1963), a newspaper St. John's, Newfoundland and Labrador
 Today Daily News (Toronto), Ontario
 Truro Daily News, Nova Scotia
 Montreal Daily News (1988–1989), Quebec

Egypt 
 Daily News Egypt

Guam 
 Pacific Daily News, Hagåtña

India 
 Daily News and Analysis

Ireland 
 Daily News (Ireland), a short-lived paper of 1982

Malaysia
 Berita Harian (Daily News)
 Oriental Daily News (Malaysia)
 Overseas Chinese Daily News
 See Hua Daily News

New Zealand 
 Taranaki Daily News, New Plymouth

People's Republic of China 
 Macao Daily News
 North China Daily News (1850–1941), Shanghai
 Oriental Daily News, Hong Kong
 Sing Pao Daily News, Hong Kong
 Tin Tin Daily News (1960–2000), Hong Kong

Republic of China 
 China Daily News (Taiwan)
 Central Daily News
 Kinmen Daily News
 Mandarin Daily News
 United Daily News

Poland
 Dziennik Związkowy (Polish Daily News)

Romania 
 Bucharest Daily News

Singapore 
 Berita Harian (Singapore)
 Shin Min Daily News

South Africa 
 Daily News (Durban)

Sri Lanka 
 Daily News (Sri Lanka)

Tanzania 
 Daily News (Tanzania)

Thailand 
 Daily News (Thailand)

Turkey 
 Hürriyet Daily News

United Kingdom 
 Birmingham Daily News
 The Daily News (UK) (1846–1930), merged to form the News Chronicle
 London Daily News (February to July 1987)
 Scottish Daily News (1975–1975)

United States 

 Daily News Record (1892–2008), American fashion trade journal
 International Daily News, sold in several major Chinatowns

Alaska
 Anchorage Daily News
 Fairbanks Daily News-Miner
 Ketchikan Daily News

Arizona
 Mohave Valley Daily News, Bullhead City
 Tempe Daily News

California
 Burlingame Daily News
 Daily News – Antelope Valley, Palmdale
 The Daily News (Palo Alto)
 Daily News (Red Bluff)
 The Daily News (San Francisco)
 East Bay Daily News, Berkeley
 Los Angeles Daily News (1981-present)
 Los Angeles Daily News (historic) (1923-1954), originally the Los Angeles Illustrated Daily News
 Los Gatos Daily News
 Nguoi Viet Daily News, Westminster
 Redwood City Daily News (2000–2009)
 San Mateo Daily News (2000–2009)
 Siskiyou Daily News, Yreka
 Vien Dong Daily News Westminster
 Whittier Daily News

Colorado
 Aspen Daily News
 Denver Daily News (2001–2011)

Connecticut
 Yale Daily News, Yale University, New Haven

District of Columbia
 The Washington Daily News

Florida
 Naples Daily News
 Northwest Florida Daily News, Fort Walton Beach
 Palatka Daily News
 Palm Beach Daily News

Georgia
 LaGrange Daily News

Idaho
 Moscow-Pullman Daily News

Illinois
 Chicago Daily News
 Effingham Daily News

Indiana
 The Ball State Daily News, Muncie
 Greensburg Daily News

Iowa
 Newton Daily News

Kansas
 Hays Daily News
 The Wellington Daily News

Kentucky
 The Daily News (Kentucky) Bowling Green
 Middlesboro Daily News

Louisiana
 Beauregard Daily News
 Bogalusa Daily News
 Southwest Daily News, Sulphur

Maine
 Bangor Daily News

Massachusetts
 Athol Daily News
 The Daily News of Newburyport
 The Daily News Transcript, Norwood
 The Daily News Tribune, Waltham
 The MetroWest Daily News, Framingham
 The Milford Daily News

Michigan
 Hillsdale Daily News
 Midland Daily News

Minnesota
 Daily News (Wahpeton)
 Mesabi Daily News, Virginia
 Winona Daily News

Missouri
 Boonville Daily News
 The Neosho Daily News
 The Rolla Daily News

Montana
 Havre Daily News

Nebraska
 Norfolk Daily News

New Mexico
 Alamogordo Daily News

New York
 New York Daily News
 New York Daily News (19th century) (1855–1906)
 The Daily News (Batavia)

North Carolina
 Daily News (Eden)
 Jacksonville Daily News
 Washington Daily News

North Dakota
 Minot Daily News
 Daily News (Wahpeton)

Ohio
 Dayton Daily News
 Sidney Daily News
 Troy Daily News

Oklahoma
 Anadarko Daily News
 Elk City Daily News
 Weatherford Daily News

Pennsylvania
 The Daily News (McKeesport)
 Lebanon Daily News
 Philadelphia Daily News

Rhode Island
 The Newport Daily News

Tennessee
 The Daily News Journal, Murfreesboro
 Daily News (Kingsport)
 The Daily News (Memphis)

Texas
 The Daily News (Texas), Galveston
 The Lufkin Daily News
 Focus Daily News
 Henderson Daily News

Vermont

Washington
 The Daily News (Longview, Washington)
 Peninsula Daily News, Port Angeles

West Virginia
 Mineral Daily News-Tribune, Keyser
 West Virginia Daily News, Lewisburg
 Williamson Daily News

Wisconsin
 Beloit Daily News
 Rhinelander Daily News

United States Virgin Islands 
 The Virgin Islands Daily News

Zimbabwe 
 Daily News (Harare)
 Zimbabwe Daily News